The Grand Forks Gazette is the local newspaper of Grand Forks, British Columbia, founded in 1897. The paper is published every Wednesday and features local news, sports, and local events from city council coverage, to Border Bruin hockey.  The columns feature local issues, and the paper also has feature stories on everything from residents to local history. The Grand Forks Gazette has a second publication called the West Kootenay Advertiser published on Fridays to 27,000 homes in the West Kootenay and Boundary region.

See also
List of newspapers in Canada

References

External links
Grand Forks Gazette – Official website.

Black Press newspapers
Publications established in 1897
1897 establishments in British Columbia
Weekly newspapers published in British Columbia